vCard, also known as VCF (Virtual Contact File), is a file format standard for electronic business cards. vCards can be attached to e-mail messages, sent via Multimedia Messaging Service (MMS), on the World Wide Web, instant messaging, NFC or through QR code. They can contain name and address information, phone numbers, e-mail addresses, URLs, logos, photographs, and audio clips.

vCard is used as data interchange format in smartphone contacts, personal digital assistants (PDAs), personal information managers (PIMs) and customer relationship management (CRMs). To accomplish these data interchange applications, other "vCard variants" have been used and proposed as "variant standards", each for its specific niche: XML representation, JSON representation, or web pages. 

An unofficial vCard Plus format makes use of a URL to a customized landing page with all the basic information along with a profile photo, geographic location, and other fields. This can also be saved as a contact file on smartphones.

Overview 
The standard Internet media type (MIME type) for a vCard has varied with each version of the specification.

vCard information is common in web pages: the "free text" content is human-readable but not machine-readable. As technologies evolve, the "free text" (HTML) was adapting to be also machine-readable.

RDFa with the vCard Ontology can be used in HTML and various XML-family languages, e.g. SVG, MathML.

Related formats 
This proposal has not yet become a widely used standard. The RFC 7095 does not use real JSON objects, but rather uses arrays of sequence-dependent tag-value pairs (like an XML file).

hCard is a microformat that allows a vCard to be embedded inside an HTML page. It makes use of CSS class names to identify each vCard property. Normal HTML markup and CSS styling can be used alongside the hCard class names without affecting the webpage's ability to be parsed by a hCard parser. h-card is the microformats2 update to hCard.

MeCard is a variation of vCard made by NTT DoCoMo for smartphones using QR Codes. It uses a very similar syntax, but in a more consolidated way as the storage space on QR Codes is limited. It's also limited in the amount of data that can be stored, not just by the standard but the size of QR Codes.

Example 

An example of a simple vCard (from RFC 6350, abbreviated):

  BEGIN:VCARD
  VERSION:4.0
  FN:Simon Perreault
  N:Perreault;Simon;;;ing. jr,M.Sc.
  BDAY:--0203
  GENDER:M
  EMAIL;TYPE=work:simon.perreault@viagenie.ca
  END:VCARD

This is the vCard for "Simon Perreault" (the author of RFC 6350), with their birthday (omitting the year), email address and gender.

Properties 
vCard defines the following property types.

All vCards begin with BEGIN:VCARD and end with END:VCARD.   All vCards must contain the VERSION property, which specifies the vCard version.  VERSION must come immediately after BEGIN, except in the vCard 2.1 standard, which allows it to be anywhere in the vCard. Otherwise, properties can be defined in any order.

See also 
 CardDAV
 FOAF (ontology)
 Geo URI scheme
 MeCard

References

External links 
 vCard 4.0 at its developer CalConnect
 describing the vCard format version 4
vCard and vCalendar (old versions) from the Internet Mail Consortium in the Internet Archive

Computer file formats
Business cards
Internet Standards